Sigmund Stanley "Sig" Gryska (November 4, 1914 – August 27, 1994) was a Major League Baseball shortstop who played with the St. Louis Browns in  and .

External links

1914 births
1994 deaths
Major League Baseball shortstops
St. Louis Browns players
Baseball players from Chicago